Gowrie Mountain is a locality in the Toowoomba Region, Queensland, Australia.

Geography 
The Warrego Highway forms the northern boundary of the locality while Dry Creek forms the southern boundary. The lower of the two peaks of Gowrie Mountain (630 metres above sea level) is in the far east of the locality while the higher peak (674 metres above sea level) is in the neighbouring locality of Charlton.

History 
The locality takes its name from the mountain which, in turn, took its name from a corrupted Aboriginal word cowarie, which probably referred to Gowrie Creek, but which also referred to the freshwater mussel.

Gowrie Mountain Provisional School opened on 30 May 1901, becoming Gowrie Mountain State School on 1 January 1909. It closed in 1967.

References

External links 

Toowoomba Region
Localities in Queensland